John Michael D'Arcy (August 18, 1932 – February 3, 2013) was an American prelate of the Roman Catholic Church. He served as the eighth bishop of the Diocese of Fort Wayne-South Bend in Indiana from 1985 to 2009. He previously served as an auxiliary bishop of the Archdiocese of Boston in Massachusetts from 1974 to 1985.

Biograph

Early life 
John D'Arcy was born on August 18, 1932, in Boston, Massachusetts, to Irish immigrants. His parents were Michael and Margaret (Moran) D'Arcy.  He had three sisters:  Mrs. Mary Caprio, Sister Anne, and Mrs. Joan Sheridan.  He entered St. John's Seminary in Boston in September 1949.

D'Arcy was ordained to the priesthood for the Archdiocese of Boston on February 2, 1957. D'Arcy attended the Pontifical University of St. Thomas Aquinas in Rome from from 1965 to 1968, earning a doctorate in spiritual theology. He served as spiritual director and professor of spiritual theology at St. John's Seminary from 1968 to 1985, and also as pastor of St. Mary Star of the Sea Parish in Beverly, Massachusetts.

Auxiliary Bishop of Boston 
On December 30, 1974, D'Arcy was appointed as an auxiliary bishop of the Archdiocese of Boston and titular bishop of Mediana by Pope Paul VI. He received his episcopal consecration on February 11, 1975, from Cardinal Humberto Medeiros, with Bishops Thomas Riley and Lawrence Riley serving as co-consecrators. He became episcopal vicar for the Lowell Region on July 21, 1981.

When serving as auxiliary bishop in Boston, D'Arcy "warned against the Catholic Church’s transfer of pedophile priest John Geoghan to a new parish, according to the church's own investigators. But Bishop D'Arcy's 1984 letter to Archbishop Bernard Francis Law about Geoghan’s history of abusing young boys did no good." Geoghan was left in his youth-groups job and "D'Arcy was transferred to Indiana".

Bishop of Fort Wayne-South Bend
D'Arcy was named bishop of the Diocese of Fort Wayne-South Bend by Pope Paul II on February 26, 1985. Replacing Bishop William McManus, D'Arcy was installed on May 1, 1985.

In March 2009, D'Arcy declared he would boycott the May graduation ceremony at the University of Notre Dame because President Barack Obama would be delivering the commencement speech and receiving an honorary degree. Noting Obama's "unwillingness to hold human life as sacred," he said that "a bishop must teach the Catholic faith 'in season and out of season,' and he teaches not only by his words–but by his actions" and asked Notre Dame if by choosing Obama "it has chosen prestige over truth."

Retirement and legacy 
Pope Benedict XVI accepted D'Arcy's resignation as bishop of Fort Wayne-South Bend on November 14, 2009.

John D'Arcy died on February 3, 2013, in Fort Wayne, Indiana, from lung and brain cancer at age 80. Following his death, visitations were held at both St. Matthew's Cathedral in South Bend and the Cathedral of the Immaculate Conception in Fort Wayne. The Mass of Christian Burial for D'Arcy was held on February 8, 2013, at the Cathedral of the Immaculate Conception followed by the Rite of Committal, which was conducted privately with his family in the crypt of the cathedral.

See also
List of the Catholic bishops of the United States#Province of Indianapolis

Sources
Diocese of Fort Wayne-South Bend
Michael J. D'Arcy obituary, Nashua Telegraph (Nashua, New Hampshire) December 2, 1977 page 2.

References

External links
"Bishop John D’Arcy Dies at 80; Sounded Alarm on Sex Abuse" (limited no-charge access), New York Times, February 5, 2013.

1932 births
2013 deaths
Roman Catholic bishops of Fort Wayne–South Bend
20th-century Roman Catholic bishops in the United States
21st-century Roman Catholic bishops in the United States
Roman Catholic Archdiocese of Boston
Clergy from Boston
Saint John's Seminary (Massachusetts) alumni
Pontifical University of Saint Thomas Aquinas alumni
Deaths from lung cancer in Indiana
Deaths from brain cancer in the United States
American whistleblowers